Sloan Privat (born 24 July 1989) is a French professional footballer who plays as a forward.

Career

Sochaux
Born in Cayenne, French Guiana, Privat began his career with FC Marmandais. In 2002, he attracted interest from professional club Sochaux. In 2005, the interest became concrete with the club offering him an aspirant (youth) contract. He arrived at the club's aspiring youth academy amongst a host of other youth talent. In 2007, Privat played on the Sochaux under-19 team, alongside Frédéric Duplus, Geoffrey Tulasne, and Vincent Nogueira, that won the Coupe Gambardella. On 22 September 2007, he made his professional debut in a 1–0 defeat to Bordeaux coming on as a late match substitute. The cameo appearance was his only one of the 2007–08 season.

For the 2008–09 season, Privat was given the first-team number 15 shirt. He made his first career start on 14 September 2008 against Lille. In the match, he scored his first goal for the club giving the team a 1–0 lead, however the match would end in a 1–1 draw. He signed his first professional contract on 12 December, until 2012. He extended his deal further in August 2011 for three years, to run until summer 2014.

Clermont Foot
On 4 August 2010, Privat was loaned to Ligue 2 club Clermont for the 2010–11 Ligue 2 season. His arrival paid immediate dividends with the player netting 10 league goals in the first half of the campaign. Privat finished the Ligue 2 season at Clermont season with 20 goals in 36 matches.

Gent
On 26 August 2013, Privat signed a four-year contract with Jupiler Pro League club Gent. On 6 October 2013, he scored his first league goal in Belgium against Racing Genk.

Caen
He was loaned back in France in June 2014 to Stade Malherbe Caen, for the 2014–15 season.

Guingamp
In June 2015, Privat joined En Avant de Guingamp on loan for the 2015–16 season, with an option given to Guingamp to sign him permanently. A year later, Guingamp announced the club had exercised the option.

Valenciennes
On 31 January 2018, the last day of the 2017–18 winter transfer window, Privat was released from his Guingamp contract and joined Ligue 2 side Valenciennes FC on -year contract until summer 2019.

Osmanlıspor
In January 2019, he joined Osmanlıspor. His contract was terminated on 31 May 2019.

Return to Sochaux
On 31 July 2019, Privat returned to Sochaux, signing a one-year contract with a club option for an additional year. He was released at the end of the 2019–20 season.

Bourg-Péronnas
After seven months without a club, Privat signed for Championnat National side Bourg-Péronnas on 4 January 2021.

Personal life
His younger brother Stéphane (born 1998) is also a footballer, who plays as striker for FC Marmande 47.

Honors
French Guiana
Caribbean Cup bronze: 2017

Career statistics

International goals
Scores and results list the French Guiana's goal tally first.

References

External links
 
 

1989 births
Living people
Sportspeople from Cayenne
French people of French Guianan descent
Association football forwards
French footballers
France under-21 international footballers
French Guianan footballers
French Guiana international footballers
Ligue 1 players
Ligue 2 players
Championnat National players
Championnat National 2 players
Championnat National 3 players
Belgian Pro League players
FC Sochaux-Montbéliard players
Clermont Foot players
K.A.A. Gent players
Stade Malherbe Caen players
En Avant Guingamp players
Valenciennes FC players
Ankaraspor footballers
Football Bourg-en-Bresse Péronnas 01 players
Expatriate footballers in Belgium
French expatriate footballers
2017 CONCACAF Gold Cup players